DéCLARAtions is the first studio album by Clara Morgane, released on June 18, 2007. Its best ranking regarding sales in France has been 46th (in June 2007).

The single "Sexy Girl" has been ranked 4th.

Track listing

Credits
Words: Clara Morgane

Singles
J'aime (2007)
J'aime (feat. Lord Kossity) - 5'00
Sexy Girl (2007)
Sexy Girl - 3'10
J'aime - 3'24
Andy - 4'08
Nous Deux - Remix By Tom Snare (2008)
Nous Deux - 3'32

References 

2007 albums
Clara Morgane albums